Dudley Girls' High School was a selective higher education school which provided education for girls aged 11–18 years.

History
It was located in Dudley, England, and opened on 8 December 1910 near the town centre in Priory Road, 12 years after Dudley Grammar School (for boys) moved to neighbouring premises. The school was also known as Dudley High School.

The school traditionally served the 11-18 range, but from September 1972 it served pupils aged 12–18 due to a local reorganisation of education. Despite being a single sex school, the school co-hosted many dramatic and musical productions with the Boys' Grammar School, and by the 1960s boys and girls from the two schools were taught together for some subjects at sixth form level.

Dudley Girls High School served Dudley and its surrounding area for 65 years, before it merged with the grammar school - as well as the Park Secondary Modern School - to form The Dudley School in September 1975, nine years after proposals to merge the two schools were first made. From this date onwards, boys and girls aged 12–18 years were taught in the buildings of both the former grammar school and the high school. The old Park School buildings were retained for two years as an annexe of The Dudley School.

After the high school
By the mid 1980s, further plans for school reorganisation were afoot, and another merger came in September 1989, this time when the Dudley School merged with The Blue Coat School to form Castle High School - the new school also taking in some of the Sir Gilbert Claughton School pupils upon that school's phased closure, and the creation of the new school was completed in September 1990 with the arrival of some pupils from the closed Mons Hill School.

The former grammar school buildings were expanded between 1990 and 1995, leaving the former high school buildings disused after July 1995, although a sports hall which had existed on the site since about 1960 was retained for more than a decade afterwards, with a new entrance being built from the old grammar school site to enable the old high school to be demolished.

Dudley council had considered using the old high school as council offices, but these plans were scrapped in favour of demolition, which took place in early 1996.

The site of the school was converted into public car park in 1997, with a campus of Dudley College being opened on the site in September 2012. Although the main school building was demolished,  during the site's use as a car park the original wall and site entrance on Ednam Road were retained.

Headteachers
 Miss M. B. Ambrose - 1950s-1960s
 Miss Fisher - Acting Head   
 Freda Kellett - 1964

Former teachers
 Marion Richardson, art

Notable alumnae
 Mary Percy Jackson, medical practitioner
 Sue Lawley, television newsreader
 Dorothy Round Little, tennis player
 Baroness Jenny Tonge, former Lib Dem MP (1997-2005) for Richmond Park, and former doctor
 Jenny Wilkes, BBC WM radio presenter

References

 Dudley Girls' High School: A Portrait of a School 1881-1975, Maureen DuMont, Robinswood Press, October 26, 2002, 

Girls' schools in the West Midlands (county)
Defunct schools in the Metropolitan Borough of Dudley
Educational institutions established in 1910
Defunct grammar schools in England
Educational institutions disestablished in 1975
1910 establishments in England
1975 disestablishments in England